Eupithecia invicta is a moth in the family Geometridae. It is found in Nepal, India (Kumaon, Meghalaya), China (Yunnan, Shanxi), Vietnam and Thailand.

References

Moths described in 1981
invicta
Moths of Asia